Moreno Valley High School is a charter high school located in the Angel Fire, New Mexico. Founded by a dedicated group of Angel Fire citizens, Moreno Valley High School was the first Paideia-based high school in New Mexico. It remains one of the only high schools totally based in Paideia methodology. Michael Strong was the first Director from 2001 until 2003. The school’s charter was unanimously renewed by the Cimarron School Board in 2007 and again in 2012.

Moreno Valley High School is nationally ranked by both the Washington Post Challenge Index Challenge Index and by U.S. News & World Report and has been designated as a Gold Medal School.

In 2017 a group of parents had suggested that a sports program be developed.

References

External links
 

Public high schools in New Mexico
Charter schools in New Mexico
Educational institutions established in 2002
Schools in Colfax County, New Mexico
2002 establishments in New Mexico